Lynwood 'Woody' K. Ireland (born in 1942 in Clarksburg, West Virginia) is an American politician and a Republican member of the West Virginia House of Delegates representing District 7 since January 2007.

Education
Ireland earned his BS degree from West Virginia University.

Elections
2012 Ireland was unopposed for both the May 8, 2012 Republican Primary with 1,885 votes, and the November 6, 2012 General election, winning with 5,356 votes.
2006 When District 7 Republican Representative Otis Leggett retired and left the seat open, Ireland won the 2006 Republican Primary and won the November 7, 2006 General election against Democratic nominee Paul Janes, who had run for the seat in 1998 and 2002.
2008 Ireland was unopposed for the May 13, 2008 Republican Primary, winning with 2,231 votes, and won the November 4, 2008 General election with 4,222 votes (63.6%) against Democratic nominee Ronald Nichols.
2010 Ireland was unopposed for both the May 11, 2010 Republican Primary, winning with 1,631 votes, and the November 2, 2010 General election, winning with 4,486 votes.

References

External links
Official page at the West Virginia Legislature

Lynwood Ireland at Ballotpedia
Lynwood (Woody) Ireland at the National Institute on Money in State Politics

Date of birth missing (living people)
1942 births
Living people
Republican Party members of the West Virginia House of Delegates
Politicians from Clarksburg, West Virginia
People from Ritchie County, West Virginia
United States Army soldiers
West Virginia University alumni
21st-century American politicians